Novosphingobium pentaromativorans is a species of high-molecular-mass polycyclic aromatic hydrocarbon-degrading bacterium. It is Gram-negative, yellow-pigmented and halophilic. With type strain US6-1T (=KCTC 10454T =JCM 12182T). Its genome has been sequenced.

References

Further reading
 Staley, James T., et al. "Bergey's manual of systematic bacteriology, vol. 3."Williams and Wilkins, Baltimore, MD (1989): 2250–2251.

External links
LPSN
Type strain of Novosphingobium pentaromativorans at BacDive -  the Bacterial Diversity Metadatabase

Sphingomonadales
Hydrocarbon-degrading bacteria
Bacteria described in 2004
Halophiles